OCV may refer to 
On-chip variation
Open-circuit voltage
Voltaic Communist Organization
Offshore Combatant Vessel, a proposed multi-role ship class to be built by the Royal Australian Navy
Optical Character Verification (automated verification/inspection of printed text using Machine vision)